Gabriele Schöpe (later Gabriele Krauß, born 2 April 1944) is a retired German diver. She competed at the 1960 Summer Olympics in the 10 m platform and finished in 15th place. She won two bronze medals in this event at the 1962 and 1966 European championships.

References

1944 births
Living people
German female divers
Divers from Dresden
Olympic divers of the United Team of Germany
Divers at the 1960 Summer Olympics
21st-century German women
20th-century German women